Keys to the City is the debut album by jazz pianist Mulgrew Miller, recorded on June 28, 1985, and released by Landmark Records.

Background 
The album is dedicated to Miller's wife, Tanya, and musicians who inspired him. The record contains eight compositions: four originals and four jazz standards. The originals are: the blues-inspired "Song for Darnell", named after his son; "Promethean", inspired by a Greek myth; "Portrait of a Mountain"; and "Saud's Run". The last two are dedicated to McCoy Tyner.

Track listing

Personnel 
Mulgrew Miller – piano
Ira Coleman – bass
Marvin Smith – drums

References 

1985 albums
Landmark Records albums
Albums produced by Orrin Keepnews
Mulgrew Miller albums